Fadzayi Mahere (born 30 July 1985) is a prominent Zimbabwean lawyer and politician who currently serves as the National Spokesperson for the Citizens Coalition for Change, a political party in Zimbabwe. After a career in legal advocacy, she emerged around April 2016 first as an independent parliamentary candidate, and then with the Movement for Democratic Change. As such she was part of the mass movement of activists rising against the government and has been arrested several times as a result.

Early life and education

Fadzayi Mahere grew up in Mount Pleasant, Harare, and attended Arundel School.

She enrolled in 2004 at the University of Zimbabwe, where she obtained a Bachelor of Law Honours degree (LLB Hons) in 2008. In 2010 she enrolled at the University of Cambridge for a Master of Laws degree in International Criminal Law & International Commercial Litigation, graduating in 2011.

Career
In June 2016, Advocate Mahere participated in the Reserve Bank of Zimbabwe public inquisition on the printing and introduction of additional bond notes in 2016. At the event, Mahere highlighted that the bond notes were unconstitutional, according to Chapter 17 of the Constitution, on public finance.

Also in 2016, as part of the activist movement #thisflagmovement, she began motivating and mobilising people, using mainly social media channels such as Facebook Live and Twitter to rise against the government.

In 2017 she announced her bid to represent the Harare suburb of Mount Pleasant in the 2018 elections as an independent candidate. She was arrested in 2017 after organising a soccer tournament in her constituency and was charged under the Public Order and Security Act (POSA).

In June 2019 she officially joined the party Movement for Democratic Change (MDC) as the Secretary for Education. In May 2020 she was announced as the National Spokesperson for the MDC Alliance coalition. She worked to call out corruption and holding administrative authorities in Zimbabwe accountable.

Notable achievements 
Mahere was part of the Lead Counsel (Zimbabwe) team that won the All Africa International Humanitarian Law Moot Court Competition in Arusha, Tanzania, in 2007 and was awarded Best Oral Argument in the Finals.

External links 

 Fadzayi Mahere on Twitter

References 

1985 births
Living people
Alumni of Arundel School
Citizens Coalition for Change politicians
University of Zimbabwe alumni
Zimbabwean women lawyers
Movement for Democratic Change – Tsvangirai politicians
Political activists
21st-century Zimbabwean lawyers